Wilshire/Western station is an underground rapid transit (known locally as a subway) station on the D Line of the Los Angeles Metro Rail system. It is located under Wilshire Boulevard at Western Avenue, after which the station is named, in the Mid-Wilshire and Koreatown districts of Los Angeles. It is the current western terminus of the D Line.

Prior plans called for the D Line to extend to Fairfax Avenue, then turn north into the San Fernando Valley but due to political disagreements, the line currently terminates here and the B Line travels to the Valley via Vermont Avenue. Metro is now currently constructing the Purple Line Extension to extend the D Line west from this station to Westwood/VA Hospital station in Westwood, near UCLA.

The two artwork installations at Wilshire/Western are called "People Coming", and the other "People Going". They are large murals at each end of the station. The artist responsible is Richard Wyatt, a Lynwood native.

The courtyard features a plaque commemorating former California Assemblymember Alfred H. Song and is officially named "Wilshire/Western/Alfred Hoyun Song station," although the full name is not used on any station signs.

Service

Station layout

Hours and frequency

Connections 
, the following connections are available:
 Big Blue Bus (Santa Monica): 7, Express 7, Rapid 7
 LADOT DASH: Wilshire Center/Koreatown, Hollywood/Wilshire

Notable places nearby 
The station is within walking distance of the following notable places:
Pellissier Building and Wiltern Theatre

References 

D Line (Los Angeles Metro) stations
Koreatown, Los Angeles
Mid-Wilshire, Los Angeles
Wilshire Boulevard
Railway stations in the United States opened in 1996
1996 establishments in California